"Stingray", sometimes called The Pilot, is the first episode of Stingray, a British Supermarionation television series created by Gerry and Sylvia Anderson and produced by their company AP Films (APF) for ITC Entertainment. Written by the Andersons and directed by Alan Pattillo, it was first broadcast on 4 October 1964.

The series follows the World Aquanaut Security Patrol (WASP), an organisation responsible for policing the Earth's oceans in the mid-2060s. Its flagship, Stingray, is a combat submarine crewed by Captain Troy Tempest, Lieutenant "Phones" and Marina, a mute young woman from under the sea. Stingrays adventures bring it into contact with underwater civilisations – some friendly, others hostile – as well as mysterious natural phenomena.

In the first episode, while investigating the unexplained destruction of a submarine, Troy and Phones discover that there is intelligent life on the ocean floor when they are captured by the forces of King Titan, tyrannical ruler of the underwater city of Titanica. Condemned to die, they are saved from execution by Titan's slave Marina, who joins the WASP and becomes the third member of the Stingray crew.

Plot
While patrolling an ocean trench, the World Security Patrol (WSP) submarine Sea Probe is torpedoed and destroyed by a vessel resembling a mechanical fish. The WSP orders its marine branch, the World Aquanaut Security Patrol (WASP), to investigate. At Marineville, the WASP's headquarters on the West Coast of North America, Commander Shore (voiced by Ray Barrett) assigns Captain Troy Tempest and navigator Lieutenant "Phones" (voiced by Don Mason and Robert Easton) to the mission.

Troy and Phones depart in Stingray, the WASP's flagship submarine, and proceed to Sea Probes last known position. Troy, who has long suspected the existence of intelligent undersea life, believes a hostile force is responsible for the loss of Sea Probe and other vessels. As Stingray passes the island of Lemoy, Surface Agent X-2-Zero (voiced by Robert Easton) – an undersea spy operating from a house on the island – contacts his master, King Titan (voiced by Ray Barrett), ruler of the ocean floor city of Titanica. X-2-Zero informs Titan of Stingrays approach.

On reaching the trench, Stingray is attacked by one of Titan's Mechanical Fish. Troy and Phones are captured by its crew of Aquaphibians – Titan's soldiers – and brought to Titanica. Troy is taken to Titan's throne room, where Titan tells him that their fate will be decided by Teufel, a captive fish that Titan worships as a god. Teufel turns his back on Troy, leading Titan to declare Troy and Phones enemies of Titanica and sentence them to death. On land, Stingray is presumed lost and Marineville prepares to retaliate by bombarding the trench with hydromic missiles.

Escorted by Marina, Titan's mute slave-girl, Troy and Phones are placed on board a Mechanical Fish for the journey to their execution site. However, Marina betrays Titan and frees Troy, enabling him to overpower the Aquaphibian pilots and seize control of the vessel. Troy and Phones use the Mechanical Fish to tow Stingray back to Marineville and the missile attack is aborted.

Over dinner with Commander Shore and his daughter, Lieutenant Atlanta Shore (voiced by Lois Maxwell), Troy presents Marina as the newest member of the Stingray crew. Atlanta, Troy's love interest, realises that she has gained a rival for his affections.

Production
The episode has no on-screen title but is referred to as "Stingray" in ITC documentation. It is also known as "Stingray (The Pilot)" or just "The Pilot". However, it was not devised as a true pilot as Lew Grade, APF's chairman and investor, had approved the series format before production began. In his biography, Gerry Anderson said that the first episodes of APF's TV series were called "pilots" for the sake of convenience.

Due to a continuity error, the lead WSP Commander is voiced first by Don Mason (in the scene set at WSP HQ), then by Ray Barrett (during the character's videophone conversation with Commander Shore). In later episodes the same character is voiced by David Graham and Robert Easton. The ocean floor backdrops for the windows of Titan's throne room were created using back projection. According to Gerry Anderson, the hydromic missile launch towers were modelled on contemporary rocket launch towers at Cape Kennedy.

The episode has had several adaptations in other media. Its plot was merged with those of "Deep Heat" and "Subterranean Sea" to create "Into Action with Troy Tempest", one of three Stingray EP audio plays released by APF's sister company Century 21 Records in 1965. The episode was also included in two compilation films. At some point in 1963, APF combined it with the episodes "An Echo of Danger", "Raptures of the Deep" and "Emergency Marineville" to create a 99-minute Stingray feature presentation. Originally screened for Japanese TV executives, this was broadcast in a condensed form under the title "The Reunion Party" on BBC Four in 2008. The second film, The Incredible Voyage of Stingray, was a made-for-TV feature produced by ITC New York in 1980. Combining the first episode with "Plant of Doom", "Countdown" and "The Master Plan", this was one of 13 compilations from various Anderson series to be shown on US syndicated and cable TV during the 1980s.

Broadcast and reception
The episode was first broadcast on 4 October 1964 on Anglia, ATV London, Border, Grampian and Southern Television, followed by ATV Midlands, Channel and Westward Television on 6 October. It was repeated in all of the aforementioned regions on 25 December 1964 and had its first showing on Granada Television on 30 December.

Critical response
TV Zone magazine regards the episode as the best of Stingray, describing it as an "excellent introduction to the series" with "phenomenal puppetry and effects work". It praises the "gripping" story – "pure comic-book fiction, with its quasi-Atlantean civilisation and sci-fi trappings" – as well as the "economy" of the writing: "In a few short scenes, we're introduced to all the heroes and villains, and the fascinating character of Marina." The publication is critical of some aspects, calling Titan a "one-note" villain with no motive other than "being evil" and Troy's trial by Teufel "just bizarre".

According to Simon Archer and Marcus Hearn, the episode recycles several plot elements from Fireball XL5s first episode, "Planet 46". This, they argue, "re-affirms many of [Stingrays] links" to its precursor. They also suggest that the scene in which Surface Agent X-2-Zero quickly converts his dining room into a communications post "uncannily foreshadows" a scene in the film Goldfinger (1964). Ian Fryer argues that while most of the episode is played seriously, consisting of "male-dominated situations of peril" similar to APF's earlier series, Marina's arrival marks a change in tone: "Suddenly the emotional palate of the series has grown larger in ways that Fireball XL5 – and especially the all-male environment of Supercar – never attempted: romance is in the air."

References

Works cited

External links

1964 British television episodes
Science fiction television episodes
Stingray (1964 TV series)